Daggubati Suresh Babu (born 24 December 1958) is an Indian film producer, studio owner and distributor who serves as the managing director of Suresh Productions. In 2012, he received the Andhra Pradesh state Nagireddy–Chakrapani National Award for his contribution to popular cinema.

He has produced several Telugu-language films under Suresh Productions banner including Bobbili Raja, Coolie No.1, Preminchukundam Raa, Ganesh, Kalisundam Raa, Jayam Manade Raa, Nuvvu leka nenu lenu, Malliswari, Tulasi, Drushyam and Gopala Gopala.

Early life
He is the son of the producer D. Ramanaidu and elder brother of popular actor Venkatesh. He did his schooling in Don Bosco school at Madras. He completed his PUC from Loyola College. He did his graduate studies at University of Michigan in 1981.

He is married to Lakshmi and they have three children, Rana Daggubati, Malavika Daggubati and Abhiram Daggubati.

Career
He started his career with the film Devatha in 1982, though he started putting his name as producer from Bobbili Raja onwards.

Filmography

As a producer

As a presenter

As an actor

Awards and nominations

Other works
He served as the president of the A P Film Chamber of Commerce for the year 2011–12. 
He has been unanimously elected the president of Telugu Film Chamber of Commerce (TFCC) from 2015 to 2017. He is the first president of the body after AP Film Chamber of Commerce was renamed Telugu Film Chamber of Commerce.
He is also associated with Hyderabad Angels as vice president.

References

External links
 

Living people
Film producers from Andhra Pradesh
People from Prakasam district
Nandi Award winners
Filmfare Awards South winners
Don Bosco schools alumni
University of Michigan alumni
Telugu film producers
1958 births